Grindl is an American situation comedy that began in fall 1963 on NBC, originally sponsored by Procter & Gamble. The show, starring Imogene Coca in the title role, lasted for one season.

Synopsis
Grindl (Coca) worked for Foster's Temporary Employment service and was employed doing domestic work. The show revolved around the different humorous situations she would get into with each new job she was assigned to each week.

The first show featured guest star Telly Savalas, who would later star as Kojak. Other guest stars included George Kennedy, Paul Lynde, Robert Q. Lewis, Jack Albertson, Robert Karnes, Darryl Richard, and Leif Erickson.

Grindl was scheduled on Sunday nights at 8:30 p.m. in September 1963, sandwiched between Walt Disney's Wonderful World of Color and Bonanza, both major hits. The series was pitted against the second half of The Ed Sullivan Show on CBS which greatly contributed to its low ratings. It was canceled in spring 1964, after completing a full season of 32 episodes.

Cast
 Imogene Coca...Grindl
 James Millhollin...Anson Foster, Grindl's boss

Episodes

Trivia

A character similar to Grindl, named Dorcas, appears in the 1963 David Swift movie Under the Yum Yum Tree, and is also played by Coca.

The episode, "Grindl's Day Off", was originally scheduled to be broadcast on November 24, 1963, but was pre-empted by NBC News coverage of the John F. Kennedy assassination.

External links

1963 American television series debuts
1964 American television series endings
1960s American sitcoms
1960s American workplace comedy television series
Black-and-white American television shows
English-language television shows
NBC original programming
Television series by Sony Pictures Television
Domestic workers in fiction